Edward Ponsonby may refer to:
 Edward Ponsonby, 8th Earl of Bessborough, British peer
 Edward Ponsonby, 2nd Baron Sysonby, British Army officer and peer